James Robinson (December 6, 1982) is an American football wide receiver who is currently a free agent. He was signed as by the Miami Morays as a street free agent in 2005. He played college football at Butler Community College.

Robinson has also been a member of the Florida Frenzy, Las Vegas Gladiators, South Georgia Wildcats, Kansas City Brigade, Miami Dolphins, Washington Redskins, Cleveland Browns, Toronto Argonauts, Saskatchewan Roughriders and Pittsburgh Power.

Professional career

Florida Frenzy
After finishing his collegiate career at Butler Community College, Robinson signed with the Florida Frenzy of the National Indoor Football League in 2005. He appeared in every game for the Frenzy through the 2006 season.

Las Vegas Gladiators
Robinson attended training camp with the Las Vegas Gladiators of the Arena Football League in 2007 before being released on March 20.

South Georgia Wildcats
Robinson signed with af2's South Georgia Wildcats for the 2007 season and caught 77 passes for 1,168 yards and 27 touchdowns his rookie season.

First stint with Argonauts
On September 23, 2007, Robinson signed a practice roster agreement with the Toronto Argonauts of the Canadian Football League, remaining there for the duration of the season.

Kansas City Brigade
Robinson signed with the Kansas City Brigade of the Arena Football League in 2008, catching two passes for 11 yards and a touchdown while also adding three tackles.

Second stint with Argonauts
In 2008, Robinson played in 13 games for the Argonauts, catching 25 receptions for 381 yards and 1 touchdown. His best performance came in week 4 of the 2008 Toronto Argonauts season when he hauled in 10 catches for 194 yards including scoring a 90-yard touchdown. He was released by the team on August 5, 2009, after the Argonauts re-signed P. K. Sam.

Miami Dolphins
Robinson was signed by the Miami Dolphins on August 10, 2009. He was waived by the Dolphins during final cuts on September 5, but re-signed to the team's practice squad the following day. He was released from the practice squad on November 4.

First stint with Browns
Robinson was signed to the Cleveland Browns' practice squad on November 19, 2009. He was released on December 1.

Washington Redskins
Robinson was signed to the Washington Redskins' practice squad on December 9. After his contract expired following the season, Robinson was re-signed to a future contract on January 5, 2010.

He was waived on May 3, 2010.

Second stint with Browns
Robinson signed with the Cleveland Browns on June 3, 2010.

Third stint with Argonauts
On June 25, 2010, it was announced that Robinson had rejoined the team and had agreed to a practice roster spot. He was released by the team on June 24, 2011.

Saskatchewan Roughriders
On July 12, 2011, Robinson signed with the Saskatchewan Roughriders of the Canadian Football League. After one season with the team, he was released on February 10, 2012.

Pittsburgh Power
Robinson was signed by the Pittsburgh Power on November 8, 2012. However, due to injuries, he did not make his debut with the team until May 11, 2013. In that game against the Philadelphia Soul, he made 6 catches for 84 yards and 4 touchdowns, resulting in him being named the J. Lewis Small Playmaker of the Game.

References

External links
ArenaFan.com profile
ArenaFootball.com profile
CFL.ca profile

1982 births
Living people
Players of American football from Fort Lauderdale, Florida
American football wide receivers
American players of Canadian football
Canadian football wide receivers
Saskatchewan Roughriders players
Las Vegas Gladiators players
South Georgia Wildcats players
Toronto Argonauts players
Kansas City Brigade players
Miami Dolphins players
Cleveland Browns players
Washington Redskins players
Chicago Slaughter players
Pittsburgh Power players